Jim Miceli (born April 24, 1957) is an American football coach.  He is the head coach at Toll Gate High School.  Miceli served as the head football coach at Ramapo College from 1988 to 1991 and at Bryant University from 1999  to 2003. He compiled a record of 49–37 as a head coach. He was previously the running backs coach for the University of Rhode Island.

Head coaching record

References

External links
 Rhode Island profile

1957 births
Living people
Bryant Bulldogs football coaches
Akron Zips football coaches
Fordham Rams football coaches
Georgetown Hoyas football coaches
Maryland Terrapins football coaches
Pittsburgh Panthers football coaches
Ramapo Roadrunners football coaches
Rhode Island Rams football coaches
High school football coaches in Maryland
Southern Connecticut State University alumni